Salmedin Mesihović (born 5 April 1975) is a Bosnian professor of history and archaeology at the Faculty of Philosophy, Department of History, at University of Sarajevo, Bosnia and Herzegovina.

Education
He is a trained historian and archaeologist. He studied history at the Department of History of the Faculty of Philosophy, at the University of Sarajevo and graduated in 1999. His postgraduate and magisterial came in 2004 at the Archaeology postgraduate studies of the Faculty of Philosophy, of the University of Zagreb, defending his master's thesis: Problem kulturne i etničke zajednice Autarijata. At the same university, he defended his doctoral dissertation in 2007 entitled: Dezitijati: kulturna i narodnosno-politička zajednica u Iliriku i osvajanja Oktavijanova doba.

Employment and works
He has been working at the Department of History of the Faculty of Philosophy in Sarajevo since 2000. He became assistant professor in 2009, and an associate professor of Ancient history from 2013. He participated in a number of scientific conferences.
He was the Head of the Department of Archaeology at the Faculty of Philosophy of the University of Sarajevo from 2009 to 2012.
As an author Mesihović has written a number of papers, published in various domestic and international scientific and professional journals and periodicals, such as Godišnjak Centra za balkanološka ispitivanja, Prilozi Instituta za istoriju, Historijska traganja, Znakovi vremena, Bosna Franciscana.
He is a co-author of several textbooks, schoolbooks for primary and secondary education level schools.

Bibliography 
 „RES PVBLICAE SCRIBONIANI“, p.1-33, © 2010, UniBook, Self Publishing & Printing On Demand.
 „Progresivni komunizam“ © 2010, UniBook, Self Publishing & Printing On Demand.
 Rimski vuk i ilirska zmija. Posljednja borba, Filozofski fakultet Sarajevo, Elektronsko izdanje, Sarajevo, 2011
 Revolucije stare Helade i Rimske republike, Filozofski fakultet Sarajevo, Elektronsko izdanje, Sarajevo, 2011 
 Antiqui homines Bosnae, Filozofski fakultet Sarajevo, Elektronsko izdanje, Sarajevo 2011

Literature 
 Monument 60th Anniversary of the Faculty of Philosophy in Sarajevo (1950-2010), Faculty of Philosophy, Sarajevo 2010, p.140-141. 
 Curriculum vitae, Salmedin Mesihovic

References

Academic staff of the University of Sarajevo
21st-century Bosnia and Herzegovina historians
Bosnia and Herzegovina archaeologists
1975 births
Living people